Kramrowo  (German Kramershof) is a village in the administrative district of Gmina Kwidzyn, within Kwidzyn County, Pomeranian Voivodeship, in northern Poland.

Before 1920 the area was part of Germany. For the history of the region, see History of Pomerania.

References

Kramrowo